The Santa Monica Police Department (SMPD) is a law enforcement agency of the city of Santa Monica, California.

History
The department was founded in May 1897. At the beginning of the twentieth century, cracking down on public drunkenness consumed much of the department's time, and police officers used wheelbarrows to remove offenders to jail. As the town grew, the department created a detective bureau and a call box system so that police would be alerted faster. Illegal gambling operations also ran rampant during the Great Depression, bribing the police to look the other way.

The police department played a key role in the city's efforts to reduce homelessness. As part of the Homeless Liaison Program, the department assigns a group of officers to coordinate with other agencies to provide housing to the homeless, instead of perpetuating an arrest-and-release cycle. From 2007 to 2009, the program reduced homelessness levels by 8%. Efforts by Santa Monica police to fine homeless persons have often proved ineffective, not only because people arrested for homelessness are unable to pay the fine, but also because landlords are unwilling to lease housing to people with arrest warrants for unpaid fines. The police will also call paramedics for homeless individuals in need of medical attention. Some homeless individuals have complained that the police do a poor job of keeping track of their confiscated possessions, such that they rarely receive their items back once released from jail; while others have asked the police to pay more attention to crimes committed by homeless offenders against homeless victims.

The police department operates a jail, which has a maximum capacity of 112 people, but is only allowed to confine each person for 48 hours at most. The Serial Inebriate Outreach Program tries to persuade people currently in the jail for drunkenness to seek treatment for alcoholism; the program has had a 25% success rate as of 2006.

On July 24, 2007, Lindsay Lohan had her first mugshot by the Santa Monica Police Department when she was booked and charged with drunken driving and cocaine possession. She was released on $25,000 bail.

Santa Monica named Jacqueline Seabrooks its first female police chief in April 2012. She assumed her new post in May 2012, succeeding Timothy J. Jackman, who retired.

In 2013, the department was criticized for paying 28 of its staff more than 200,000 dollars per year. Police Chief Seabrooks claimed that high salaries were partially due to overtime paid by private events employing the officers. The department's total budget that year was 77 million dollars.

Former Police Chiefs of the SMPD
George B. Dexter (1896 – 1898)
Max K. Barretto (1898 – 1911)
Ellis E. Randall (1912 – 1915)
Fred W. Ferguson (1916 – 1920)
Clarence E. Webb (1921 – 1936)
Charles L. Dice (1936 – 1939)
Clarence E. Webb (1940 - 1945 Second Term)
Stacy Schmidt (1945 – 1947)
Joseph P. McClelland (1947 - 1950)
James F. Keane (1979 – 1991)
James T. Butts, Jr. (1991 - 2006)	
Timothy J. Jackman (2006-2012)
Jacqueline Seabrooks (2012-2018)
Cynthia Renaud (2018-October 25, 2020)
Jacqueline Seabrooks-Interim status (2020 - October 2021)
 Ramon Batista (October 18, 2021 - Present)

References

External links

Police department
Municipal police departments of California
Organizations based in Los Angeles County, California
1897 establishments in California